Tanais dulongii is a species of malacostracan in the family Tanaididae. It inhabits the shores and shallow waters of the Atlantic coast of Europe and North and South America, the Mediterranean Sea, and south-west Australia (Indian Ocean).

References

Tanaidacea
Crustaceans of the Atlantic Ocean
Crustaceans of the Indian Ocean
Fauna of the Mediterranean Sea
Crustaceans described in 1826
Taxa named by Jean Victoire Audouin
Articles created by Qbugbot